SUCCESS Academy (Southern Utah Center for Computer, Engineering and Science Students) is an early college high school based in Cedar City, Utah, United States.  SUCCESS Academy has three campuses, one located at Southern Utah University (SUU) in the Iron County School District, one at Utah Tech University in the Washington County School District.

History
The Southern Utah Center for Computer, Engineering and Science Students, commonly known as SUCCESS Academy, was founded in 2005. SUCCESS Academy is a charter school sponsored by the Iron County School District.  SUCCESS Academy was selected by the Utah Partnership to participate in an Early College High School grant. The grant money was provided by the Bill and Melinda Gates Foundation.

SUCCESS Academy currently has two school locations. The first is located in Cedar City, Utah on the Southern Utah University campus. The second is in St. George on the Utah Tech University campus.

SUU SUCCESS Academy first opened their doors in August 2005. They were originally located in the SUU Science Building. They are currently located in the Multipurpose Building on SUU campus. SUU SUCCESS started with 9th and 10th grade students, but is currently open to 9th -12th graders.

UT SUCCESS Academy opened in August 2006 and is currently open to 10th - 12th graders. They are currently located in the Technology building at UTU. UT SUCCESS Academy students may attend college classes besides within the Technology building in their 11th grade year with special permission. This is in addition to 12th grade on campus classes that the students may take. UT SUCCESS Academy students also participate in the SUU Regional Science fair and regularly sends students to the Intel International Science Fair (ISEF). Some of these students have gone one to be quite successful.

ACE Academy was a SUCCESS Academy school with a tech focus. This school is now joined with UT SUCCESS at the Technology Building, and there is a tech track offered at that location, as well as the standard classes UT SUCCESS offers.

Founding
The Utah Partnership was created under the direction of Governor Michael Leavitt. It was charged with the task to identify and create Early College High Schools. These were often referenced as High Tech Highs. The founders of SUCCESS Academy are the Iron County School District, Southern Utah University and funding from the Bill and Melinda Gates Foundation.

Awards 
SUCCESS Academy has been nationally recognized for several awards. Recent awards include being chosen by Newsweek as the top high school in America for Beating the Odds for college readiness, and for its students rising above financial obstacles and challenges. Another award is for SAGE test results. For the state of Utah, SUCCESS received the top Math scores in the state. In Language Arts, they received fourth place in the state. In 2019, SUCCESS Academy was named #2 Best School District in Utah, #2 Safest School District in Utah, and #4 for Utah School Districts with the Best Teachers by Niche. SUCCESS Academy had also been given #2 Best School District in Utah by Niche in 2018. Several SUCCESS academy students have been named Sterling Scholars at their boundary schools and received the Daniels Scholarship.

Graduation information

The graduation rates for SUCCESS Academy students are:

Scholarship and ACT information 
The graduating class of 2015 received many scholarships. The total dollar amount for SUU's graduating class was $877,000.00. The total dollar amount for DSU's graduating class was $1,478,967.00.  Students received an average composite ACT score of 25.52 over the past five years.

Iron County Campus
Classes taught at SUU Campus:

Clubs:
 Science Club
 Computer Science Club (officially titled SUCCESS Academy Computer Technology Club)
 Photobook Club
 Math Club
 Creative Writing Club
 National Honor Society

SUU SUCCESS Academy also features a Student Government.

Washington County Campus
Classes taught at Utah Tech Campus:

Clubs:
 Astronomy Club
 Book Club
 Computer Club
 Honor Society
 Science Club

References

External links
 School's official website

 SUU SUCCESS's official website
 UT SUCCESS's official website

Public high schools in Utah
Schools in Iron County, Utah
Schools in Washington County, Utah
Charter schools in Utah